The following is a list of villages in Volyn Oblast in Ukraine.

Kamin-Kashyrskyi Raion

Kovel Raion

Lutsk Raion

Volodymyr-Volynskyi Raion 

Volyn